«Sibur-RT JSC», formerly known as «TAIF JSC» (Tatar-American Investment and Finance company), is a Russian investment holding and oil company, headquartered in Kazan. As of 2008, it processed up to 98% gas and chemical and petrochemical products in the Tatarstan region. By 2015, it incorporated a number of subsidiary companies, including TAIF-Invest, TAIF-ST, TAIF Service, Avers bank, Avers insurance company, TVT and Novy Vek television companies, Karsar and TAIF-Telecom. In 2019, the company was listed  among the largest private-owned corporations in Russia. In April 2021, it merged with the Sibur petrochemicals holding. In April 2022, the company changed its name to «Sibur-RT JSC».

History

Expansion

The Tatar-American Investment and Finance company (TAIF) was created on the basis of Kazan Foreign Trade Association, established in 1990 by the government of the Tatar Autonomous Soviet Socialist Republic. The government of Tatarstan acquired a controlling interest of the new company's shares and provided it with stakes in several leading republican enterprises, including Tatneft (4%), Kazanorgsintez (3%), Nizhnekamskneftekhim (9%), and others. An American company NKS Trading became another shareholder of TAIF as it invested ten million dollars and bought 36% of its stocks.

Before the end of the century, most of TAIF's crucial subsidiaries were established. In June 1996, the company founded its first subsidiary branch – Meta-TAIF – to participate in the republican program of liquidating dilapidated housing. A year later, a newly created TAIF-Invest received a brokerage license; LLC Karsar was acquired to act as an intermediary in imports, exports, and customs activities; and CJSC TAIF-NK was organised in Neftekamsk to build an oil-processing plant. With the emergence of TAIF-TELCOM in 1998 and the TVT radio and television company in 1999, the company expanded into media holdings. In the same year, TAIF also opened a transportation company TAIF-Magistral and two construction enterprises – TAIF-Art and TAIF-ST.

Over next years, the company acquired and established around 30 subsidiaries, mostly developing in investments, construction, service sector, and petrochemical industry. With government backing, by the end of 2005, TAIF bought Tatneft's and Nizhnekamskneftekhim's shares (54,2% in total) of the Nizhnekamsk oil refinery and gained an absolute control over it. Upon the purchase of Kazanorgsintez's and Nizhnekamskneftekhim's controlling stakes in 2006, TAIF became the provider of 96% of services in chemical, petrochemical, oil, and gas processing industries in Tatarstan. The same year, TAIF announced the launch of its first IPO at the Moscow Interbank Currency Exchange, selling bonds with 8,2% interest. However, the IPO did not happen.

By 2009, TAIF's investments in the modernization of its subsidiaries' production capacities resulted in an increase in revenue. It was reported, for instance, that Kazanorgsintez's revenue was doubled since its acquisition by TAIF in 2006.

According to Forbes's rankings, in 2012, TAIF became one of the largest non-public companies in Russia.

In 2015, the company continued its expansion into oil and gas industry through the acquisition of Tatnefteproduct's controlling interest.

TAIF's CEO, Albert Shigabutdinov, announced another launch of TAIF's IPO in his interview to the Vedomosti newspaper and stated that by 2019, the company's EBITDA almost doubled (TAIF estimated it as 166 billion rubles) as compared to the previous year. He also argued that the production of various polymers was TAIF's main source of income and that the holding increased the production of chemicals by almost 8 times from 1995 to 2019. According to Shigabutdinov, in 2019, investments constituted up to 22% of the company's revenue, construction - about 0,5%, and the service sector (gas stations, entertainment centers, customs, and warehouses) – up to 4%. However, despite these facts, some analytics linked the growth of TAIF's EBITDA to Shigabutdinov's announced resignation and regarded investments in TAIF as risky ones.

Merge with Sibur
In 2018–2019, the TAIF holding was reorganised and split into TAIF Management Company and TAIF JSC. The former united the subsidiary companies active in telecommunications, construction industry, and the service sector; the latter controlled the oil, gas, and chemical companies, including Kazanorgsintez, Nizhnekamskneftekhim, and TGC-16. In April 2021, TAIF Management Company signed an agreement to merge TAIF JSC with Sibur – one of the largest petrochemicals companies in Russia. As a part of the merger, Sibur would create a new company and give to the current shareholders of TAIF JSC 15% of Sibur's shares in exchange for a controlling interest in TAIF's petrochemical and energy enterprises. At the same time, TAIF-NK refinery, TAIF's gas station network Karsar, and a number of other assets would remain the property of TAIF Management Company. The deal was finalised in October 2021. In April 2022, Sibur changed the name of TAIF JSC to «Sibur-RT JSC».

As of 2022, TAIF Management Company controlled a number of subsidiaries, including the TAIF-NK oil refinement company.

Owners
Before the 2010s, details about TAIF's shareholders were not publicly disclosed. According to Albert Shigabutdinov, after the Russian financial crisis of 1998, the total amount of TAIF's debt exceeded 500 million dollars, so the company was privatised around the same period. Shigabutdinov also reported that in 2002, TAIF was controlled by the Shaimievs, Shigabutdinovs, and Sulteevs families. In 2005, Mintimer Shaimiev, the first president of Tatarstan, admitted in an interview that his son  owned some shares of TAIF as one of the company's founders.

The full list of TAIF's owners became known only in 2014, when it was published in the materials of the Moscow Arbitration Court. According to the materials, Radik Shaimiev owned 11,46% of the company's shares, Airat Shaimiev - the second son of Mintimer Shaimiev - 11,45%, Guzelia Safina - Deputy General Director of TAIF - 4.5%, Kamila Radikovna, Mintimer Shaimiev's granddaughter - 2%.
Rustem Sulteev and his wife Lidia Sulteeva collectively held 19,9% of the stocks, and Albert Shigabutdinov and his son Timur owned the same interest. Among the shareholders, the documents also mentioned the National Settlement Depository (with Sergei Porotsky as the beneficiary of the package) - 4,84% of shares, and Avers Bank (whose beneficiaries were the Shigabutdinov, Safina, Vladimir Presnyakov, Radik Shaimiev, Rustem Sulteev, and Olga Ignatovskaya) - 2,42%. In addition, minor shares belonged to the Austrian companies Micopex Export-import (1,02%), Djikanovic-Koprivica Mirjana (0,99%), and Koprivica Nikola (0,99%).

References

Literature
 
 
 
 

Oil companies of Russia
Investment companies of Russia
Chemical companies of Russia
Companies established in 1995
Companies based in Kazan